Robert Bingham may refer to:

 Robert Bingham (writer) (1966–1999), American writer and a founding editor of Open City Magazine
 Robert Bingham (American football) (1888–1929), head coach of the Rhode Island Rams football team in 1912
 Robert Worth Bingham (1871–1937), American politician, judge, newspaper publisher and diplomat
 Robert Jefferson Bingham (1824–1870), English photography pioneer
 Robert de Bingham (1180–1246), bishop of Salisbury, 1229–1246
 Bob Bingham (born 1946), American actor and singer
 Robert Bingham (glaciologist), British reader in glaciology and geophysics at the University of Edinburgh